Upthegrove is a surname. Notable people with the surname include:

Dave Upthegrove, American politician
Dewitt Upthegrove, American businessman and politician
Laura Upthegrove, 20th-century American outlaw, bank robber, bootlegger and pirate
William Hendry Upthegrove, American army captain

See also
Op den Graeff family
Upthegrove Beach, Florida, an unincorporated community in Okeechobee County, Florida, United States